A radius is a straight line or distance from the center to the edge of a curve.

Radius may also refer to:

People
 Alexandra Radius (born 1942), Dutch ballerina
 Justus Radius (1797–1884), German pathologist and ophthalmologist
 Radius Prawiro (1928–2005), Indonesian economist and politician

Arts, entertainment, and media

Fictional entities
 Radius (Chrono Cross), a character in Chrono Cross
 Radius (comics), a superhero in the Marvel Comics universe
 Radius (R.U.R.), a character in Karel Čapek's science fiction play R.U.R.

Film
 Radius (film), a 2017 Canadian film directed by Caroline Labrèche and Steeve Léonard

Music
 Radius (band), a band from Los Angeles, California
 Radius (music ensemble), a London music ensemble founded by Tim Benjamin

Companies
 Radius Inc., a defunct computer hardware company
 Radius Intelligence, a defunct enterprise software company
 Radius Payment Solutions, a payment and fleet services technology and software company
 Radius Travel, a travel management company

Mathematics
 Radius (graph theory), the minimum distance from a graph's node to the node that is farthest from it
 Radius of convergence (in calculus), the radius of the region where a complex power series converges
 Radius of curvature, a measure of how gently a curve bends
 Radius of gyration, the root-mean-square distance from a set of points or masses to a given center
 The radial coordinate in a
 Polar coordinate system (2D)
 Cylindrical coordinate system (3D)
 Spherical coordinate system (3D)
 The inradius or circumradius of a shape

Science and technology
 Radius (bone), one of the two bones in a forearm
 Bend radius, the minimum radius to which one can bend a pipe, tube, sheet, cable, or hose without damage
 RADIUS (Remote Authentication Dial In User Service), a network authentication protocol
 Turning radius, the minimum radius at which a vehicle can negotiate a turn